Cheech or The Cheech may refer to:

People 
 Cheech Marin (born 1946), American stand-up comedian and actor
 Cheech, professional wrestler, part of The Miracle Ultraviolence Connection

Other 
 Cheech (film), a 2006 Canadian comedy-drama film
 Cheech Wizard, an American Underground Comix character
 The Cheech, an alternate name for The Cheech Marin Center for Chicano Art, Culture & Industry of the Riverside Art Museum
 The Cheech, a 2019 film about the development of The Cheech Marin Center

See also 
 Cheech & Chong, the comedy duo